The Chinese Ambassador to Qatar is the official representative of the People's Republic of China to the State of Qatar.

List of representatives

References 

 
Qatar
China